Duke of Galliera is an Italian noble title that has been created several times for members of different families. The name of the title refers to the comune of Galliera, which is located in the Province of Bologna in Emilia–Romagna.

History
The title was first created in 1812 by Napoleon I for Josephine of Leuchtenberg, daughter of Eugène de Beauharnais (and granddaughter of Napoleon's first wife, Josephine). She kept the title even after she married Oscar, Crown Prince of Sweden. Napoleon had already given her the Palazzo Caprara in Bologna in 1807, which was renamed the Palazzo Galliera.

In 1837, after a decade of negotiations, Crown Prince Oscar sold properties attached to the dukedom to Marquis Raffaele de Ferrari of Genoa. The following year, the marquis received the title of Duke of Galliera from Pope Gregory XVI. In 1839, King Charles Albert of Sardinia confirmed the grant to the marquis and added the title of Prince of Lucedio.

With his wife, Maria Brignole-Sale, the new Duke of Galliera had three children, but two of them died young and childless. The third, the famous philatelist Philipp von Ferrary, renounced the title and the inheritance to which it was linked.

In 1877, after the death of her husband, Maria Brignole-Sale (a fervent Orléanist) bequeathed his Italian properties to Prince Antoine, Duke of Montpensier, the youngest son of Louis-Philippe I, King of the French. After the death of Maria Brignole-Sale in 1888, Prince Antoine received the ducal title of Galliera from King Umberto I of Italy. Since then, the title of Duke of Galliera has belonged to the Orléans branch of the Spanish Royal Family, although the properties attached to the dukedom were sold by Infante Antonio in 1920.

Bernadotte-Leuchtenberg dukes

Ferrari Brignole-Sale dukes

Orléans dukes

See also
Duchess of Galliera
Palais Galliera

Notes and references

History of the Duchy of Galliera. 
Dominique Paoli, Fortunes and Misfortunes of the Princes of Orleans, 1848-1918, Artena, 2006, p. 248. 248.
Duke of Galliera Escapes. Appears in Italy from Madrid, where King was his Guardian. The New York Times. September 12 1919.
Franco Ardizzoni, 'Il Ducato di Galliera, Dalle terre della "bassa" all'Europa'